The Meitei Manipuri philosophy or Kanglei Meetei philosophy refers to the philosophical traditions of Ancient Manipur (Ancient Kangleipak). In 15th century BC, the Wakoklon Heelel Thilel Salai Amailon Pukok Puya, one of the foremost and the oldest Meitei scriptures based on the antique philosophical traditions, was written in Ancient Manipur. It is the basis of the ideology of Sanamahism, the primitive Meitei religion.
The philosophical norms are inscribed in the massive materials of many ancient Meitei chronicles.

Further reading 

 Chayom Thupki Meetei Philosophy Part 1 Translation By James Oinam
 Chayom Thupki Meetei Philosophy Part 2 Translation By James Oinam
 Chayom Thupki Meetei Philosophy Part 3 Translation By James Oinam
 Chayom Thupki Meetei Philosophy Part 4 Translation By James Oinam
 Chayom Thupki Meetei Philosophy Part 5 Translation By James Oinam
 Chayom Thupki Meetei Philosophy Part 6 Translation By James Oinam
 Chayom Thupki Meetei Philosophy Part 7 Translation By James Oinam
 Chayom Thupki Meetei Philosophy Part 8 Translation By James Oinam
 Chayom Thupki Meetei Philosophy Part 9 Translation By James Oinam
 Chayom Thupki Meetei Philosophy Part 10 Translation By James Oinam
 Chayom Thupki Meetei Philosophy Part 11 Translation By James Oinam
 Chayom Thupki Meetei Philosophy Part 12 Translation By James Oinam

Bibliography 

 Manipur, Past and Present: The Heritage and Ordeals of a Civilization
 Meetei Mayek 18 Subagee Kanglon Amasung Wangulon
 The Cultural Heritage of Manipur

References

Other websites 

 Reclaiming the Meetei Scriptural Knowledge for a Harmonious World
 Concepts of some important words used in Puya Wakoklon Heelel Thilel Salai Ama ilon Pukok
 The Puya Wakoklon Heelel Thilel Salai Ama ilon Pukok And Modern Science
 The Puya Wakoklon Heelel Thilel Salai Ama ilon Pukok And Modern Science Part 2
 Extra terrestrial Connection of the Meeteis Part 2
 Extra terrestrial Connection of the Meeteis Part 3
Meitei culture
Pages with unreviewed translations